Ashland, Louisiana may refer to:

 Ashland, Concordia Parish, Louisiana, an unincorporated community
 Ashland, Natchitoches Parish, Louisiana, a village
 Ashland, Terrebonne Parish, Louisiana, an unincorporated community
 Ashland, Tensas Parish, Louisiana, an unincorporated community